Jonathan Bragdon is an American artist who has lived in the Netherlands since 1979. His work is represented in numerous international collections including the Stedelijk Museum.

Jonathan Bragdon works and lives in the Netherlands.

Life and work
Bragdon attended University of Strasbourg in 1963 and then enrolled in the Ecole d’ Etudes Sociales et Pedagogiques, Lausanne, for art therapy in psychiatry in 1965. After a summer interning at L’Hôpital Psychiatrique de Malèvoz and the sell-out of his first solo show at the Schuster Gallery, Cambridge, Massachusetts in September 1967, he decided to become a professional artist. Bragdon moved to the Netherlands in 1989 and settled permanently after marriage.

“Bragdon’s rigorous examination of landscape becomes something akin to a struggle. He describes it as a “free fall” in which the discernable spatial arrangement of things and their objective denotation gradually fall apart. The outer world has become nothing but a loose network of possibilities that are ordered anew during the lengthy drawing process. “It is as if the existence of the landscape and myself come into balance [...]”

This balance is embodied in the main characteristic of Jonathan Bragdon’s artwork – the simultaneousness of representation and abstraction that is evident on levels of production as well as reception. According to Dr. Dorothée Brill (Museum für Moderne Kunst, Frankfurt), “One moment the drawing appears to be a detailed depiction of each leaf, stem and stone; the next they dissolve into an abstract network of lines.” The observer is not offered a predetermined standpoint; rather, he is drawn into a vivid and pulsating dialogue with the work.

Executed in a range of media including graphite, watercolor, and ink, Bragdon’s drawings are fascinating works that bear a meditative quality despite their strong emotional impact.”

Exhibitions
2008	 Why I Think My Drawings Are Not A Waste Of Time, Aurel Scheibler Berlin
2006	 Phoebus Gallery, Rotterdam
2005	 Gongju International Art Festival, R.O. Korea
2002	 Kunsttempel, Kassel, in “Stadtprogramm im documenta-jahr 2002”
2000	 Galerie “frontstore”, Basel
2000 Grafisch Atelier ‘t Gooi, Hilversum
1988	 Wetering Gallery, Amsterdam
1987	 Galerie Resy Muijsers, Tilburg
1985	 Wetering Gallery, Amsterdam
 1985    Galerie Fenna de Vries, Rotterdam
1985     Galerie Orez Mobil, Den Haag
1984	 Wetering Gallery, Amsterdam
1983	 Galerie Fenna de Vries, Rotterdam
1982	 Wetering Gallery, Amsterdam
1982     Galerie Resy Muijsers, Tilburg

Notes and references

External links
 Jonathan Bragdon Website
 Jonathan Bragdon at Aurel Scheilber/ ScheiblerMitte, Berlin
 Jonathan Bragdon on Artnet

American draughtsmen
American contemporary artists
Dutch contemporary artists
Living people
1944 births
Artists from Wilmington, Delaware
University of Strasbourg alumni